Courtney Romello Baker-Richardson (born 5 December 1995) is an English footballer who plays as a forward for Crewe Alexandra.

Club career

Coventry City
Baker-Richardson made his professional debut with Coventry City as a substitute on 7 December 2013 in a 1–1 FA Cup Second Round draw with Hartlepool United, coming on to replace Franck Moussa after 71 minutes.

Non-league
On 20 February 2014, Baker-Richardson joined Conference side Tamworth on a youth loan. He made his debut on 22 February 2014, coming on in the 68th minute for Lee Hildreth in the 1–1 draw against Welling United. He subsequently joined Northern Premier League Premier Division team Ilkeston on loan in March 2014.

On Friday 7 August 2015, Baker-Richardson signed for Southern League Premier side Kettering Town for the 2015–16 season. However following a bad injury in October that year he was ignored by manager Marcus Law and switched to fellow Southern League Premier team Leamington in February 2016.

After a successful 2016–17 season with Leamington, Baker-Richardson went on trial with Premier League team Leicester City in August 2017.

Swansea City
On 14 August 2017, Baker-Richardson joined Premier League side Swansea City on a two-year deal. He made his debut for Swansea on 28 August 2018 in a 1–0 defeat to Crystal Palace in the EFL Cup. He scored his first goal for the club on 29 September 2018 during a 3–0 win over Queens Park Rangers

On 9 August 2019, Baker-Richardson joined Accrington Stanley on loan until the end of the season.

Barrow
On 8 October 2020, following release from Swansea, Baker-Richardson joined League Two side Barrow on a free transfer. On 28 January 2021, he joined Barnet on loan for the rest of the season. He was released by Barrow at the end of the season.

Newport County
In June 2021 he joined Newport County on a one-year deal for the 2021-22 season. He made his debut for Newport in the 2-1 League Two win against Walsall on 18 September 2021. Baker-Richardson scored his first goal for Newport on 2 October 2021 in the 3-0 League Two win against Scunthorpe United.

Crewe Alexandra
On 31 May 2022, it was reported that Baker-Richardson was joining Crewe Alexandra, newly relegated to League Two, on a two-year deal. He made a substitute appearance in Crewe's opening game of the 2022–23 season, a 2–1 victory over Rochdale at Spotland on 30 July 2022, and, after again coming on as a second-half substitute, scored his first Crewe goal in the following game, a 3–0 win over Harrogate Town at Gresty Road on 6 August 2022. He made his first Crewe start on 9 August 2022, playing in an EFL League Cup first round defeat at Grimsby Town. Baker-Richardson then scored three times in two home league games, one against Sutton United on 16 August and a first-half brace against Northampton Town on 20 August 2022. He missed Crewe's match at Carlisle United on 1 October 2022 after injuring his leg while playing Xbox, but recovered to play six games in October, scoring once, before sustaining a serious hamstring injury. He eventually returned to first-team action on 4 March 2023, coming on as a 71st minute substitute in a 1–1 draw at Sutton United.

Career statistics 
 As of 6 March 2023

References

External links

1995 births
Living people
English footballers
Footballers from Coventry
Association football forwards
Coventry City F.C. players
Tamworth F.C. players
Ilkeston F.C. players
Romulus F.C. players
Nuneaton Borough F.C. players
Redditch United F.C. players
Kettering Town F.C. players
Leamington F.C. players
Swansea City A.F.C. players
Accrington Stanley F.C. players
Barrow A.F.C. players
Barnet F.C. players
Newport County A.F.C. players
Crewe Alexandra F.C. players
English Football League players
National League (English football) players
Northern Premier League players
Southern Football League players